This is a list of TV shows that have been broadcast on TV 2 in Norway.



0–9

A

B

C

D

E

F

G

H

I

J

K

L

M

N

O

P

Q

R

S

T

U

V

W

X

Y

Z

Æ

Ø

Å

TV 2 (Norway)